Western Catchment is an area of The Nilgiris, Tamil Nadu, situated about 20 km from Ooty. The Western Catchment area is protected by the Forest Department, and tourists are not allowed in without permission. Earlier some regional movies were filmed here, but due to environmental protection permission is no longer given.

About the area 
The area is covered by grassland, and the lower points of the valleys are filled with by shola, presenting the visitor with a green carpet look, symbolic in that it is the colour of the nation's eco-friendly Green Revolution.

The hills and vegetation, streams and lake-like reservoirs include Portimund Lake, just outside Western Catchment.

Animals like Nilgiri tahrs, sambars, and mongoose live in Western Catchment.

See also
Western Ghats
Tropical rainforests of India

References

Tourist attractions in Nilgiris district